Jan Evans (November 22, 1937 – April 24, 2000) was an American politician.

Born in Cleveland, Ohio, Evans received her bachelor's degree from University of Northern Colorado and her master's degree from University of Nevada, Reno. She was a development officer and lived in Sparks, Nevada. Evans served in the Nevada Assembly from 1987 until her death in 2000 and was a Democrat.

Notes

1937 births
2000 deaths
Politicians from Cleveland
Politicians from Sparks, Nevada
University of Northern Colorado
University of Nevada, Reno alumni
Women state legislators in Nevada
Democratic Party members of the Nevada Assembly
20th-century American politicians
20th-century American women politicians